Abqad may refer to:
 Abqad, Chenaran
 Abqad, Mashhad